Albert Crist "Allie" Miller (June 23, 1886 – October 22, 1959) was an American football player and coach.  He served as the head football coach at Villanova College—now known as Villanova University—from 1921 to 1922, compiling a record of 11–4–3.  Miller played college football at the University of Pennsylvania from 1907 to 1909. 

Miller was the older brother of Heinie Miller, who also played at Penn and later became a college football coach. He died on October 22, 1959, at Abington Hospital in Abington Township, Montgomery County, Pennsylvania.

Head coaching record

References

1886 births
1959 deaths
American football quarterbacks
American men's basketball players
Penn Quakers football players
Penn Quakers men's basketball players
Villanova Wildcats football coaches
Washington & Jefferson Presidents football coaches
People from Lycoming County, Pennsylvania
Coaches of American football from Pennsylvania
Players of American football from Pennsylvania